Fiona Mozley (born 1988) is an English novelist and medievalist. Her debut novel, Elmet, was shortlisted for the 2017 Man Booker prize.

Life and literature
Fiona Mozley was born in 1988 in the London Borough of Hackney, and now lives in Edinburgh. She used to live in York, where she grew up and attended Fulford School. In the meantime she spent periods in London, Cambridge and Buenos Aires before moving back to York in 2013. Besides writing fiction, she is engaged on a PhD thesis at the University of York on the concept of decay in the later Middle Ages. She also works part-time in a bookshop.

Mozley sees as York's most significant literature its Mystery Plays. These along with local drama groups she views "as having influenced my own writing more significantly than any books I have read." When asked at an earlier interview about writers and works she particularly enjoyed, she mentioned some by Cormac McCarthy and Ursula Le Guin, and by Philip Pullman, whom she had loved as a child. She stated in October 2017 that she was working on a second novel. This novel, Hot Stew, was due to be published in early 2021. Mozley's novel Elmet appeared in the 2018 Irish Leaving Certificate English examination.

Work
The name "Elmet" is taken from a Celtic kingdom that once covered West Yorkshire. In the novel, Mozley "wanted to capture the ambiguity of local historical recollections; to say something about their double-edged thrall; to examine the desire to live in the past and the need to extricate oneself from it."

The novel Elmet is concerned strongly with the idea of home, "the building of a house, the preparation of food; stolen glimpses of a woman's wardrobe." This moves stealthily onto the fact that the 14-year-old narrator, Daniel, is not just domesticated, but must come to terms with being gay, or even transgender, while his older sister Cathy is a tomboy "raised in isolation by a man poorly suited to the job, and taught skills typically taken up by boys." "Daddy" is kind to his two children, but otherwise known to be violent. The father's concern is for the land: "the wilderness tamed by man's benevolent but dictatorial hand... [that] provides fertile ground for the evil that men do."

References

External links

A childhood memory of her family taking Christmas into a bail hostel Retrieved 24 June 2018.

Living people
Date of birth missing (living people)
21st-century English novelists
21st-century English women writers
1988 births